Alejandro Puente is a Mexican actor, writer and director; best known in his native country on stage for his role of Todd Anderson in the Mexican play adaptation Dead Poets Society, play starring Alfonso Herrera. Although previously he debuted on television in the series El Dandy, a series that also starred Herrera. 

Puente in his short career as a director and writer has produced two films; Adiós, Hamburgo (2018), and Verónica (2018). He also starred in the play Yo soy Dios (2015). He studied acting at the National School of Theater Art in Mexico. In New York, United States he was a disciple of Darren Aronofsky, famous director and screenwriter. 

He currently plays Santiago, a homosexual teenager in the Netflix series The Club.

References

External links 
 

Living people
Spanish-language film directors
Film directors from Mexico City
Mexican film producers
Mexican screenwriters
Mexican television actors
Mexican male television actors
21st-century Mexican male actors
Mexican male stage actors
Year of birth missing (living people)